Kadiyam is a locality in Rajamahendravaram City, India.

Geography
It has an average elevation (29 feet).

Assembly constituency
Kadiyam is an assembly constituency in Andhra Pradesh. There are 2,43,229 registered voters in Kadiyam constituency in 1999 elections.

List of Elected Members:
1978 - Patamsetti Ammiraju
1983, 1998 - Girajala Venkataswamy Naidu (Ex MLA & Ex MP)
1985 and 1994 - Vaddi Veerabhadra Rao
1989, 1999 and 2004 - Jakkampudi Rammohan Rao
2009- Chandana Ramesh
2014 to 2019 - gorantla bucchayya chowdary

References

Villages in Kadiam mandal